Temple Baptist Academy is a private Christian school located in Powell, Tennessee. It was established in 1971 by the Temple Baptist Church as a ministry to educate students with Christian values.

Total enrollment is around 200 students, from kindergarten to 12th grade. Temple Baptist Academy emphasizes parental involvement in academic and spiritual development of students.

Temple Baptist Academy is accredited by SACS CASI, an accrediting division of AdvancED.  Temple Baptist Academy is also affiliated with the Tennessee Association of Christian Schools (TACS), and is also a member of the American Association of Christian Schools (AACS) and the Association of Christian Schools International (ACSI).

The school's curriculum includes materials from Abeka, Bob Jones University Press, and Saxon.

A full music program including choirs, bands, and private instruction is available. Students may also participate in Bible quizzes, academic contests, and fine arts competition, as well as intramural and interscholastic sports.

References

External links

Baptist schools in the United States
Christian schools in Tennessee
Schools in Knox County, Tennessee
Private schools in Tennessee
High schools in Tennessee
Middle schools in Tennessee
Elementary schools in Tennessee
1971 establishments in Tennessee